Samuel Harry Strike (born 18 January 1994) is an English actor. He is best known for his role as Johnny Carter in Eastenders.

Life and career
Strike was born in Southend-on-Sea, Essex. He starred in two revival series of CBBC's M.I. High as Dan Morgan from 2013–2014. In 2014, Strike guest starred in episode two of comedy series Give Out Girls as 15-year-old named Luke, whom Marilyn dates. Strike was voted the 11th hottest lad of 2014 in a fan vote ran by sugarscape.com.

EastEnders (2013–2014)
In 2013, Strike was cast in his most famous role to date playing Johnny Carter in the BBC soap opera EastEnders. Strike's character was introduced as part of the Carter family. He is the son of Mick Carter (Danny Dyer) and Linda Carter (Kellie Bright). He made his first appearance on 26 December 2013.

His portrayal of Johnny was met with critical praise, specifically the scenes where Johnny came out to his father. Both Strike's and Dyer's sensitive performances during this scene were praised. On this particular scene, Strike said, "With that scene where Johnny comes out to Mick, I was really nervous the night it aired, because you want it to look convincing but then you want to do justice by the people that have been there and done it. It was a real proving ground for me, because it was the first time I actually had to do any proper drama acting." In an online video on the official website, Strike said, "I've had letters and Danny's had letters saying that we'd helped people to come out, and it makes things worth it."

On 14 November 2014, Strike announced that he would be leaving EastEnders and that he had already filmed his final scenes.  His character departed on 23 December 2014 but made a special appearance on 25 December episode.

After Strike's departure, EastEnders''' executive producer Dominic Treadwell-Collins said that he has no plans to recast the character of Johnny and that the "door is wide open" for Strike to return. He also added that he would "hope that Sam would come back". However, in February 2016 it was announced that the character would be recast to a new actor, with Ted Reilly taking over the role in April.

Current projects (2015–present)
Strike was cast in crime drama film Bonded by Blood 2, which was released 2 January 2017.

Strike starred in The Texas Chain Saw Massacre prequel Leatherface, alongside Stephen Dorff. The film revolves around a teenage Leatherface, who escapes from a mental hospital with three other inmates. It was written by Seth M. Sherwood and directed by Julien Maury and Alexandre Bustillo. Filming began 18 May 2015 in Bulgaria and ended on 19 June 2015. He also starred in Silent Witness in January 2016, and began filming for the Monster Party Movie in 2017. Strike found success on US television almost immediately, having guest roles in popular series Timeless and Mindhunter. He played the telepath Thale in the science fiction Netflix series Nightflyers , Misha in Chernobyl (miniseries) for HBO and Ryan Dougherty in the true crime movie The Dougherty Gang'' alongside Emory Cohen and India Eisley . In 2019 he was cast in the lead role of Roland Deschain in The Dark Tower (series) for Amazon Studios , a pilot was shot but the show was not picked up to series . In the same year Strike starred opposite Sophie Thatcher and Chosen Jacobs in the Quibi coming of age series When the Streetlights Go On as the motorcycle riding town outcast 'Casper Tatum' . It was announced in 2022 that Strike had been cast in a starring role in the film adaption of The Boys in the Boat from Metro-Goldwyn-Mayer directed by George Clooney . Strike also appeared as 'Todd' in Netflix The Sandman (TV series).

Filmography

Television

Film

Theatre

Online

Awards and nominations

References

External links

Living people
21st-century British male actors
1994 births
English male soap opera actors
Male actors from Essex
People from Southend-on-Sea